Milla biflora, Mexican star, is a species of flowering plant native to Arizona, New Mexico, Texas, Mexico, Honduras and Guatemala, where it grows at  elevation. It is perennial, growing from a  corm, and flowering in summer.

References

Brodiaeoideae
Flora of Arizona
Flora of New Mexico
Flora of Mexico
Flora of Texas
Flora of Central America
Plants described in 1793
Taxa named by Antonio José Cavanilles